The 2019 European Youth Olympic Winter Festival was held in Sarajevo & Istočno Sarajevo, Bosnia and Herzegovina from 10 to 15 February 2019.

The event had initially been planned to be held in 2017, whereas the 2019 EYOF had been planned for Erzurum. In November 2015, the two cities agreed to swap their events, since Sarajevo and Istočno Sarajevo could not be ready in time, while Erzurum already had facilities in place from the 2011 Winter Universiade.

Within the framework of the EYOF 2019 project, there were around 750 recruited volunteers, the majority of which were students.

Sports

Venues

Sarajevo

Istočno Sarajevo

Schedule

The competition schedule for the 2019 European Youth Olympic Winter Festival is as follows:

Participating nations
46 national Olympic Committees sent athletes. Azerbaijan, Malta, Monaco did not compete.

Medal table

Opening ceremony

Opening ceremony was held on City Stadium Koševo on 10 February 2019 at 19:00. The name of the ceremony is "We create together", which is selected as the title of main music-dance performance. Flame at opening ceremony was lit by Larisa Cerić, Bosnian judoka, and event is officially opened by Milorad Dodik, at the time the chairman of the Presidency of Bosnia and Herzegovina together with Janez Kocijančić, president of EOC, Abdulah Skaka, mayor of Sarajevo and Nenad Vuković, mayor of Istočno Sarajevo.

Mascot

The official mascot of the EYOF 2019 was Groodvy,  created by the Visia Agency from Istočno Sarajevo, and selected after all the votes of fans from social networks. Other proposed mascots were Jezos and Jazzy. The name Groodvy comes from the word grudva which in Bosnian and Serbian language means snowball.

Medals 

Medals have irregular shape and represents a snowball that has engraved EYOF marks on either side. Medal award ceremonies were organized daily from 7.30 pm on a specially played floor in the area between the Hills Hotel and the Termal Riviera in Ilidža.

Official song

On January 16, 2019, the official song "Za pravu raju" of the event was presented in Zetra Olympic Hall. At this occasion, Vučko, mascot of the 1984 Winter Olympics, handed "the key of fame and success" to Groodvy as stated by the mayor of Sarajevo, Abdulah Skaka. The song is performed by Elvir Laković Laka, Mirela Laković and Tarik Tanović.

The Flame of peace

Flame of Peace was lit at Stadio Olimpico in Rome on January 31. 2019, after which it started its travel to Bosnia and Herzegovina. The first stop of the flame was in Banja Luka on February 1. 2019. After Banja Luka, the flame was brought to Sarajevo International Airport on February 2. 2019, on board an aircraft of the FlyBosnia company, that had special livery for this EYOF.

During the opening ceremony, the flame of peace was carried by several famous Bosnian sports people, and on the final stage, the flame was carried by Mirsad Fazlagić, Svetlana Kitić, Ajdin Pašović, Nedžad Fazlija, Mirza Teletović, Žana Novaković, Aleksandra Samardžić and Larisa Cerić as the last person who lit the flame on the stadium.

Media

The opening ceremony in Bosnia and Herzegovina was broadcast on BHT 1 and Hayat TV.

Two postal service companies from Bosnia and Herzegovina, BH Pošta and Pošte Srpske, for this occasion issued promotional postal stamps and FDC to commemorate this event.

Closing ceremony 

The closing ceremony was held in front of the town administration of Istočno Sarajevo on 15 February 2019. During the closing ceremony, Miligram and Van Gogh, two musical groups from Serbia performed.

The event was officially closed by Milorad Dodik, and the Olympic flag was officially handed to the mayor of Vuokatti, the host town of the next European Youth Olympic Winter Festival that will be held in 2021.

References

External links

 
2019
2019 in multi-sport events
2019 in European sport
February 2019 sports events in Europe
2019 in Bosnia and Herzegovina sport
International sports competitions hosted by Bosnia and Herzegovina
Multi-sport events in Bosnia and Herzegovina
Youth sport in Bosnia and Herzegovina
Sports competitions in Sarajevo
2019 European Youth Olympic Winter Festival
Festivals in Sarajevo
2019 in youth sport